Sang-e Atash (also Romanized as Sang-e Ātash, Sang Ātash, and Sang Ātesh) is a village in Jamrud Rural District, in the Central District of Torbat-e Jam County, Razavi Khorasan Province, Iran. At the 2006 census, its population was 187, in 38 families.

References 

Populated places in Torbat-e Jam County